Edward Aysshton (died 3 July 1481) was an English politician and lawyer who was MP for Truro in 1467 and Taunton in 1472 and 1477/78, and recorder of Launceston (1460-1478). He was the only surviving son of Nicholas Aysshton.

References

1481 deaths
Recorder (judge)
People from Launceston, Cornwall
English MPs 1467
English MPs 1472
English MPs 1478
Members of the Parliament of England for Truro
Members of the Parliament of England for Taunton
15th-century English judges